Arthur Hardy was an English footballer who played in the Football League for Derby County.

References

Year of birth unknown
Date of death unknown
English footballers
Derby County F.C. players
English Football League players
Association football forwards